Steve House (born August 4, 1970) is an American professional climber and mountain guide.

Biography
House earned a Bachelor of Science in ecology from The Evergreen State College in 1995.  He has been a fully Union Internationale des Associations de Guides de Montagnes-certified guide since 1999, and is the seventh American Mountain Guides Association (AMGA) guide to complete the certification. He now guides for Skyward Mountaineering and is based in southwest Colorado, in Ridgway, Colorado.  He works as an ambassador for the technical outdoor clothing company, Patagonia, where he works with both marketing and product design, development, and testing.  He has been a Patagonia ambassador since 1999. In 2015 he co-founded Uphill Athlete with his former coach Scott Johnston.

In the autumn of 2008 , the spring of 2009, and the spring of 2011 House made three expeditions to Nepal to attempt the West Face of Makalu.

On March 25, 2010, while lead climbing on Mount Temple, Steve fell approximately 25 meters. He broke six ribs in multiple places, collapsed his right lung, fractured his pelvis in two places, and fractured several vertebrae in his spine. Barely a year later and after months of rehabilitation, House set off for the Himalaya to climb Makalu, the fifth-highest mountain in the world.

His book Beyond the Mountain was the 2009 winner of the Boardman Tasker Prize for Mountain Literature. In 2015 he and Scott Johnston published Training for the New Alpinism and The New Alpinism Training Log.

He started a mountain guiding service co-owned and co-operated by internationally certified (IFMGA) guide Vince Anderson.

Alpine climbing
He is vocal in his support of "alpine style" climbs, which involve travelling quickly with little gear, and leaving no gear on the mountain.  When, in 2004, the Russian team won the 14th Piolet d'Or for their ascent of the north face of Jannu, he criticized the team for using months to climb the face while setting up fixed ropes, and for leaving 77 ropes and multiple camps behind on the mountain.

Notable climbs
2000 Slovak Direct, Mount McKinley, Alaska Range, Alaska with Mark Twight and Scott Backes, a fast climb in 60 hours.
2003 The Talkeetna Standard, Eye Tooth, Alaska Range, Alaska, USA; FA V 5.9 WI5 1000m with Jeff Hollenbaugh
2003 Roberts-Rowell-Ward Route, Mt. Dickey, Alaska Range, Alaska, USA; second ascent VI 5.9 A2 1675m with Jeff Hollenbaugh
2004 Southwest Face, K7, Charakusa Valley, Karakorum, Pakistan (second ascent of the mountain, first ascent of route) (VI 5.10a M6 A2 80 degrees, 2400m), solo.  For this ascent he won the People's Award for the 14th Piolet d'Or.
2005 June Taulliraju (5830m), Peru Steve along with Slovenian alpinist Marko Prezelj climbed the Italian Route on Taulliraju. They climbed the route free (first free ascent) in a three-day roundtrip.
2005 Central Pillar of the Rupal Face, (4100m, M5 X, 5.9, WI4), September 1–8, on Nanga Parbat in northern Pakistan with Vince Anderson.  Completed in a little over a week (a very short period of time in comparison with many large alpine climbs), the climb won him and Anderson the Piolet d'Or.  Steve House's account was published in Alpinist Magazine-Issue 16, in which he describes the ascent as the culmination of "years of a physical and psychological journey."
2007 House-Haley (WI5 M7 1750m), Emperor Face, Mount Robson (3956m), Canadian Rockies, British Columbia, Canada.  FA of route with Colin Haley, May 25–27, 2007.
2007 K7 West (6858m), Charakusa Valley, Karakorum, Pakistan FA of peak with Vince Anderson and Marko Prezelj.
2008 House-Anderson (WI5+ M8 R/X, 1000m), North Face, Mount Alberta (3619m), Canadian Rockies, Alberta, Canada. FA of route with Vince Anderson, March 26–28, 2008

References

External links

House's ambassador page at Patagonia.com
Interview with House concerning the K7 ascent
Beyond the mountain (Book)
Steve House - climber's profile
Skyward Mountaineering

1970 births
American mountain climbers
Boardman Tasker Prize winners
Living people
Sportspeople from Bend, Oregon
People from La Grande, Oregon
Piolet d'Or winners